Edd Horler (born 13 February 1963) is a British bobsledder. He competed in the four man event at the 1992 Winter Olympics.

References

External links
 

1963 births
Living people
British male bobsledders
Olympic bobsledders of Great Britain
Bobsledders at the 1992 Winter Olympics
Sportspeople from Reading, Berkshire